Robert Thomas William McCrea, Baron McCrea of Magherafelt and Cookstown (born 6 August 1948) is a retired  Free Presbyterian minister from Northern Ireland. A former Democratic Unionist Party (DUP) politician, he represented South Antrim and Mid Ulster as their Member of Parliament (MP), representing Mid Ulster from 1983 to 1997; then South Antrim between 2000 to 2001, and then again from 2005 to 2015.

McCrea was also a Member of the Northern Ireland Assembly (MLA) for Mid Ulster from 1998 to 2007, before moving to represent South Antrim in the Assembly from 2007 to 2010.

Early life and education
McCrea was the youngest of five children born to Robert Thomas (a farmer in Stewartstown, Northern Ireland) and Sarah Jayne in August 1948. He was educated in Magherafelt and spent a short time working in Social Security in the Civil Service of Northern Ireland before beginning training as a Free Presbyterian Church of Ulster minister. He undertook this training at Ravenhill Theological Hall, on the Ravenhill Road in Belfast.

McCrea received an Honorary Doctorate of Divinity from Mariette Bible College, Ohio, United States. (This institution is not certified by the Department of Higher Education or the State of Ohio.)

Career
McCrea was a Democratic Unionist Party (DUP) member of Magherafelt District Council from its creation in 1973 until he stood down to concentrate on Westminster duties in 2010, and topped the poll in every local government election he contested from 1973–2005.

He ran unsuccessfully for the House of Commons at the 1982 Belfast South by-election. He was Member of Parliament for Mid Ulster from 1983 but lost this seat to Sinn Féin chief negotiator and deputy First Minister Martin McGuinness at the 1997 election. He took South Antrim at a by-election in 2000 caused by the death of Ulster Unionist Party MP, Clifford Forsythe, but failed to retain this seat at the 2001 election. In the 2005 election he regained the seat and he held it at the 2010 election. He was subsequently defeated by the Ulster Unionist Party in 2015.

In 1996, he was elected to the Northern Ireland Forum for Mid-Ulster. From 1998 to 2007 he was a member of the Northern Ireland Assembly for Mid Ulster.  He was therefore a political representative for two separate constituencies (Mid Ulster and South Antrim) from 2000 to 2001 and from 2005 to 2007.

At the 2007 election, he was elected as an Assembly Member for South Antrim. He resigned from the Assembly in 2010, following his return to Westminster at the general election of that year.

He is also the minister of Magherafelt Free Presbyterian Church and has made numerous gospel albums.

McCrea was created a life peer on 19 June 2018, taking the title Baron McCrea of Magherafelt and Cookstown, of Magherafelt in the County of Londonderry and of Cookstown in the County of Tyrone.

Controversy and paramilitary associations
McCrea was convicted in 1971 of riotous behaviour in Dungiven and sentenced to six months imprisonment. In 1972, McCrea issued a press release, saying, "We call on all Loyalists to give their continued support to the Ulster Defence Association as it seeks to ensure the safety of all law-abiding citizens against the bombs and bullets of the IRA. As the Catholic population have given their support to the IRA throughout this campaign of terror so must Loyalists grant unswerving support to those engaged in the cause of truth." In September that year McCrea spoke at a rally in the Shankill Road area of Belfast protesting the conduct of the British Army's Parachute Regiment stationed locally, telling the crowd: "We never asked for the Army to come in. The loyalist people of Northern Ireland could have finished it themselves with the forces in this community." Uniformed UDA members checked cars entering the Glencairn estate before the protest and a UDA Land Rover patrolled in the vicinity. In 1975 he led a prayer service at the funerals of paramilitary members Wesley Somerville and Harris Boyle. The two terrorists were part of the Glenanne gang which carried out the Miami Showband killings and were accidentally blown up when the bomb they were planting in the band's minibus went off prematurely, killing them instantly. McCrea also conducted the funeral service for Benjamin Redfern, a UDA member who died while trying to escape the Maze Prison in a bin lorry in August 1984. Redfern was serving a life sentence for the murder of two Catholics.

At the DUP annual conference of April 1986, McCrea interrupted councillor Ethel Smyth when she said she regretted the death of Sean Downes, a 24-year-old Catholic civilian who had been killed by a plastic bullet fired by the Royal Ulster Constabulary
 (RUC) during an anti-internment march in Andersontown in August 1984. McCrea shouted, "No. No. I’ll not condemn the death of John Downes [sic]. No Fenian. Never. No". In Northern Ireland and Scotland, the word Fenian is used  as a slur for Roman Catholics.

In December 1986, McCrea aroused controversy when in an interview with Hot Press magazine following a recent threat by the "Ulster Freedom Fighters" (the UDA's cover name used to claim responsibility for attacks) to bomb Dublin, he commented that the Republic of Ireland "must reap what they sow" for its role in the Anglo-Irish Agreement. McCrea also claimed that the Agreement had come about because of IRA violence, and so people living in the Republic "must expect if they live by the sword they must die by the sword."

McCrea was the target of a parcel bomb to his home on 9 August 1988, when a package sent by the Irish People's Liberation Organisation was disarmed. McCrea had become suspicious when he noticed the package had a Dublin postmark. In September 1991, following the murder of Sinn Féin councillor Bernard O'Hagan by the UDA (who claimed the shooting under its outlawed "Ulster Freedom Fighters" cover name) in Magherafelt, County Londonderry, McCrea said "He who lives by the sword often dies by the sword" and "[O'Hagan] without apology stood for the policy of the Armalite in one hand and the ballot box in the other".

In February 1992 McCrea sent a message of sympathy to the family of RUC Constable Alan Moore, who had committed suicide after shooting dead three people and injuring two others at a Sinn Féin advice centre on the Falls Road, Belfast. Moore's family lived in Ballymena, outside McCrea's constituency; McCrea did not send any message of condolence to the families of the three Catholic men who died in Moore's attack.

McCrea was criticised when he appeared on a platform at a Portadown rally in support of the senior Ulster loyalist paramilitary Billy Wright, who had been threatened by the Ulster Volunteer Force (UVF) leadership, in September 1996. Wright was the founder and leader of the Loyalist Volunteer Force (which had broken away from the UVF), and had been threatened after he broke the UVF ceasefire by ordering the death of Catholic civilian Michael McGoldrick.

In 2000, McCrea was the subject of an early day motion by two MPs, Harry Barnes and Sir Peter Bottomley. The motion referenced a claim that McCrea had visited Wright's successor as LVF leader in order to persuade the LVF not to decommission any of its weapons. This claim has yet to be substantiated.

Call for British airstrikes against Irish towns
A Northern Ireland Office memo released under the thirty-year rule in December 2014 revealed that McCrea had called for the Royal Air Force to carry out "strikes against Dundalk, Drogheda, Crossmaglen and Carrickmore" at the DUP's annual conference in April 1986.

Alternative medicine
McCrea is a supporter of homeopathy, having signed several early day motions in support of its continued funding on the National Health Service, sponsored by Conservative MP David Tredinnick.

References

External links

Maiden Speech : House of Commons – 25 October 2000 (South Antrim 1st term)
Maiden Speech : House of Commons – 25 May 2005 (South Antrim 2nd term)

1948 births
Living people
British gospel singers
Democratic Unionist Party life peers
Democratic Unionist Party MLAs
Democratic Unionist Party MPs
Democratic Unionist Party councillors
Free Presbyterian Church of Ulster ministers
Members of Magherafelt District Council
Members of the Northern Ireland Forum
Members of the Parliament of the United Kingdom for County Antrim constituencies (since 1922)
Members of the Parliament of the United Kingdom for Mid Ulster
Northern Ireland MPAs 1982–1986
Northern Ireland MLAs 1998–2003
Northern Ireland MLAs 2003–2007
Northern Ireland MLAs 2007–2011
People educated at Cookstown High School
UK MPs 1983–1987
UK MPs 1987–1992
UK MPs 1992–1997
UK MPs 1997–2001
UK MPs 2005–2010
UK MPs 2010–2015
Life peers created by Elizabeth II